The Mountain states (also known as the Mountain West or the Interior West) form one of the nine geographic divisions of the United States that are officially recognized by the United States Census Bureau. It is a subregion of the Western United States.

The Mountain states are considered to include: Arizona, Colorado, Idaho, Montana, Nevada, New Mexico, Utah and Wyoming. Sometimes West River, South Dakota is also included. The words "Mountain states" generally refer to the U.S. States which encompass the U.S. Rocky Mountains. These are oriented north-south through portions of the states of Montana, Idaho, Wyoming, Colorado, Utah, and New Mexico. Arizona and Nevada, as well as other parts of Utah and New Mexico, have other smaller mountain ranges and scattered mountains located in them as well. Sometimes, the Trans-Pecos area of West Texas is considered part of the region. The land area of the eight states together is some 855,767 square miles.

It is the fastest-growing region in the United States, with Utah, Idaho, Nevada, Colorado, and Arizona ranking among the fastest-growing states in the country.

A few subregions exist within this region:

 The Southwest region, consisting of Arizona, New Mexico, Southern Nevada, and Far West Texas
 The Intermountain region, consisting of Utah, Nevada, and Idaho, along with portions of other states
 The Front Range region, consisting of Northern New Mexico, Colorado, and Southeast Wyoming

Regional geography
The Mountain West is one of the largest and most diverse regions in the United States. Most regional boundaries of the Mountain West are often looked at the area from the High Plains to the Sierra Nevada and the Cascade Range. The southern and northern portions of the Mountain West are often split into two separate regions. The southern portion (Arizona and New Mexico) is often called the Southwest region, while the northern portion (Idaho and Montana) is often included in either the Northwest states or called the "Northern Rockies".

Terrain

Together with the Pacific States of Alaska, California, Hawaii, Oregon, and Washington, the Mountain states constitute the broader region of the West, one of the four regions the United States Census Bureau formally recognizes (the Northeast, South, and Midwest being the other three). The terrain of the Mountain West is more diverse than any other region in the United States. Its physical geography ranges from some of the highest mountain peaks in the continental United States to large desert lands and rolling plains in the eastern portion of the region. The Great Basin Desert is located in almost all of Nevada, western Utah, and southern Idaho. Portions of the Mojave Desert are located in California, but over half of the desert is located in southern Nevada, in the Mountain West. Meanwhile, the Sonoran Desert is located in much of Arizona, and the Chihuahuan Desert is located in most of southwestern and southern New Mexico, including White Sands and Jornada del Muerto. Colorado also has scattered desert lands in the southern and northwestern portions of the state, including the expansive San Luis Valley.

Colorado, New Mexico, Utah, and Arizona have other smaller desert lands, part of the Colorado Plateau. The Painted Desert is located in northern and northeastern Arizona, and the San Rafael Desert is located in eastern Utah. New Mexico has other desert lands located in the northern and northwest. Colorado has large desert lands on the colorado plateau in the northwestern, western, and southern parts of the state. These desert lands in Colorado are located in and around areas such as Royal Gorge, Great Sand Dunes National Park, Pueblo, the San Luis Valley, Cortez, Dove Creek, Delta, Canyons of the Ancients National Monument, the Roan Plateau, Dinosaur National Monument, Colorado National Monument, and the Grand Mesa. The San Luis Valley is the largest high valley desert in the world.

In the far-eastern portions of the Mountain West are the High Plains, a portion of the Great Plains. These plains mainly consist of flat rolling land, with scattered buttes, canyons, and forests located in these areas. Many people view the High Plains as the point where one begins to enter the greater Mountain West region.

The Mountain West has some of the highest mountain peaks in America. Some of the more famous mountains in the Mountain West are Mount Elbert, Pikes Peak, Blanca Peak, Longs Peak, Kings Peak, Wind River Peak, Cloud Peak, Wheeler Peak, Truchas Peak, Granite Peak, Borah Peak, and Humphreys Peak.

Climate

The climate of the Mountain West is one of the more diverse climates in the United States. The entire region generally features a semi-arid or arid climate, with somе alpine climates in the mountains of each state. Some parts of the tall mountains can receive very large amounts of snow and rain, while other parts of the region received very little rain, and virtually no snow at all. The High Plains in the eastern portion of the region receive moderate snowfalls, but very little rain.

The states of Nevada and Arizona are generally filled with desert lands and scattered mountain ranges. Much of Nevada receives little to no snow in the southern portion of the state, while northern Nevada can receive large amounts of snow in and around the mountains, and even in the desert lands in Nevada. Arizona generally receives little rain or snow, but high elevations in and near mountains receive extremely large amounts of rain and snow. Northern and northeastern Arizona display characteristics of a "High Desert", where the summers are very hot and dry, while the winters can become very cold, and it can snow as well.

Utah is also generally large desert lands, with mountains as well. However, the desert lands in Utah receive significant snowfall, and there are large amounts of snowfall on and around the mountains. Colorado and New Mexico have very similar climates. Both states can receive significant snowfalls off the mountains, while the mountains in both states receive extremely large amounts of snow. However, southern and southwestern New Mexico generally does not receive much snow at all, similar to southern Nevada and southern Arizona. The desert lands found in northeastern Arizona, eastern Utah, northern New Mexico, and western and southern Colorado are generally referred to as the "High Desert" lands.

The northern portion of the Mountain West tends to be a bit cooler than the southwestern areas. Idaho and Montana both receive significant snowfalls off the mountains and very large snowfalls in the mountains. The High Desert also exists in the northern Mountain West. Southeastern Oregon and southern Idaho have the Great Basin Desert lands located in them, which is part of the high desert.

The eight Mountain states have the highest mean elevations of all 50 U.S. states.

States

Cities

The Phoenix metropolitan area is the most populous metropolitan area of the Mountain states, followed by Denver, Las Vegas, and Salt Lake City. Phoenix is also the most populous city.

The following table is a ranking of cities within the Mountain states region, by city population.

Census statistical areas

Gallery

Politics

Bold denotes election winner.

Time zones
Mountain Time is observed in nearly the entire division, except Nevada (all but the stateline city of West Wendover) and the Idaho Panhandle. With the exception of West Wendover and Jackpot, Nevada, the entire state of Nevada, along with the Idaho Panhandle, observes Pacific Time. Daylight saving time is not observed in Arizona, except for lands within the Navajo Nation (northeast corner of the state) which observe daylight saving time due to the Nation traversing state lines. For this reason, most of Arizona is one hour behind the rest of the Mountain Time Zone from the second Sunday in March until the first Sunday in November.

See also

Mountain Time Zone
Rocky Mountains
Mountain peaks of the Rocky Mountains
United States
List of Combined Statistical Areas
List of core-based statistical areas
List of metropolitan statistical areas
List of micropolitan statistical areas
U.S. state
Western United States
Front Range Urban Corridor
Intermountain West
Northwestern United States
Pacific Northwest
Southwestern United States
Pacific Southwest
Wasatch Front

References

External links

Western Governors Association

Census regions of the United States
Regions of the Western United States